Manolis Kottis (born 25 January 1955) is a Greek former professional footballer who played as forward.

Club career

Early years
Kottis started his football career through his older brother played football in the team of Apollon Kalythies. At the age of 13, he trained with the youth team of the club and when he scored three goals in a friendly match of the division against Rodos, he was called by the managers of Apollon Kalythies and signed a sport's card for the team. His name began to be heard more and more in the football society of Rhodes, accompanied by the description of a serious scorer. When this was proven in practice with Kottis scoring twice in a friendly match against Rodos, the officials of the island's big team visited the young striker at the carpentry workshop where he worked and offered him a contract which he signed for a fee of 30 thousand drachmas.

Rodos
During the eight years he played with Rodos, he made sure to constantly prove his executive scoring ability, culminating in being named the top scorer of the second division in 1977 season with 28 goals, while also making a decisive contribution in the promotion of Rodos to the first division. He was the first player of Rodos to complete a hat-trick in the first division, as he did scoring all the goals for his club in the 3–1 win over PAS Giannina. The transfer rumors that had long started becoming more and more intense for Kottis, when in his first season with Rodos in the league as he emerged as the 2nd top scorer with 24 goals, tied with Dušan Bajević behind the 31 goals of Thomas Mavros. The main competitors for the player from Rhodes were AEK Athens and Olympiacos. The determination of Loukas Barlos emerged victorious once again when in the summer of 1980 the President of AEK visited Rhodes along with Nikos Stratos and the vice-president Petros Lalos offering 2 million drachmas to Kottis to transfer to AEK. Kottis, hesitating to leave Rhodes and doubting his acclimatization in Athens counter-proposed the amount of 2.5 million, hoping for a retreat from the President of AEK, who agreed. The signatures came in and Kottis moved to the capital wearing the yellow-black shirt.

AEK Athens
The then deadly attacking duo of Mavros-Bajević with the "short-tall" model immediately brought Kottis to the prime position of the competitor of Mavros for a place in the eleven. The position of "tall" passed from Dušan Bajević to Mojaš Radonjić, but the position of "short" was very difficult to claim due to the football class and leading personality of Thomas Mavros. The difficulties of adapting to the Greek capital, led Kottis back to Rodos as a loan for a year to then return again to the double-headed eagle. His acquaintance with the later wife from Nea Filadelfeia relieved to him from the difficulties of the life in Athens and the awareness in the administration of AEK that a partnership like the Mavros–Bajević was almost impossible to re-exist, gave Kottis the opportunities he was looking for to participate in the yellow-black jersey. He made his debut on 7 September 1980 in a 5–1 home win against Kavala. He won the Greek Cup in 1983 playing in the final in the 2–0 win against PAOK. He also scored in the 65th minute of the home win against Újpest on 14 September 1983, for the First round of the UEFA Cup Winners' Cup.

Later career
In the summer of 1984, with the arrival of Håkan Sandberg, he was left out of his coach's plans and in December of the same year he transferred to Egaleo, where he remained until the summer of 1985 season. This was followed by a trip to the other side of the United States, where he competed for two months in the US championship for New York City club Greek American AA and was paid 10 thousand dollars. Returning to Greece, he continued to play in Atromitos, Lamia and other teams of smaller categories to complete his football career in 1990 at Argonaftis Argos.

Personal life
The recent life of Kottis is divided between Athens, where his wife, Kleopatra and his daughter live, and Rhodes, where he works with the Cultural and Sports Organization of the island's Municipality while serving as General Leader and Vice President of the Rhodes team.

Style of play
Kottis was a short player, with a low center of gravity and flexible, while he had a special feel in scoring goals. A real "fox" of the small and large opposing area who was often in the right place at the right time to score. Characteristics that were very similar to those of Thomas Mavros. Their similarity in style of play even extended to both their head-balling prowess despite their relatively short stature. In all the games he played as a partner of Mavros in the attacking line of AEK, the two of them made it unimaginably difficult for the opposing defenses and the goal seemed to be a matter of time either from one or the other.

Honours

Rodos
Beta Ethniki: 1977–78, 1980–81 (South Group)

AEK Athens
Greek Cup: 1982–83

Individual
Beta Ethniki top scorer: 1976–77 (South Group)

References

1955 births
Living people
Greek footballers
Super League Greece players
Rodos F.C. players
AEK Athens F.C. players
Egaleo F.C. players
Atromitos F.C. players
PAS Lamia 1964 players
Association football forwards
People from Rhodes
Greek expatriate footballers
Expatriate soccer players in the United States
Greek expatriate sportspeople in the United States